This page lists the individuals who have served as mayor of Bloomington, Minnesota.

Bloomington's mayors are full councilmembers who serve at large.

The term of office was two years until 1995, when voters approved a change to 4-year terms.

References

Bloomington, Minnesota
Bloomington, Minnesota